Jakuta Alikavazovic (born 6 October 1979 in Paris) is a French writer. Her debut novel Corps volatils was awarded the prix Goncourt du premier roman. In 2021, her latest novel Night As It Falls was published in the United Kingdom by Faber & Faber.

Biography 
A former student of the École normale supérieure Paris-Saclay, she holds an agrégation de Lettres degree.

In 2010, her second novel Le Londres-Louxor received a very enthusiastic welcome from the press and found itself in the selection of the Prix du Livre Inter. In 2012, she published La Blonde et le Bunker, which won the special mention of the jury of the Prix Wepler. Her fourth novel L'avancée de la nuit, published in 2017, was shortlisted for Le Monde's literary prize, the Prix Médicis, the Prix Femina and the Prix du Livre Inter. She won the 2021 Prix Médicis essai for Comme un ciel en nous.

Her books are translated into English, Italian, German and Chinese.

She has a monthly column in national daily newspaper Libération. Her work has been published in Granta, Nouvelle Revue Française and El Malpensante.

Work

Novels 
2007: Corps volatils, Éditions de l'Olivier
2010: Le Londres-Louxor, Éditions de l'Olivier
2012: La Blonde et le Bunker, Éditions de l'Olivier
2017: L'avancée de la nuit, Éditions de l'Olivier / Night As It Falls, Faber & Faber

Short stories 
2006: Histoires contre nature, Éditions de l'Olivier
2008: Romeo y Julieta (un cratère), Éditions de l'atelier In 8°

Journals and collective works 
2013: "La mémoire des visages", Assises du Roman, Christian Bourgois/Villa Gillet/Le Monde
2013: "Nocturne", Nouvelle Revue Française n° 606, Gallimard
2014: "Risques et périls", Devenirs du Roman (vol.2), Éditions Inculte
2015: "Nos visages", Nouvelle Revue française no 613, Éditions Gallimard
2017: "Des larmes", Nouvelle Revue française no 623, Éditions Gallimard
2019: "À propos de certains types de circuits", Nouvelle Revue française, no 636, Éditions Gallimard

Books for children 
2004: Holmes et moi, L'École des loisirs
2004: Leçon d'équilibrisme n°1, L'École des loisirs
2012: Irina vs Irina, L'École des loisirs

Prizes and distinctions 
In 2007, Jakuta Alikavazovic was a laureate of the "Bourse du Talent écrivain" of the Jean-Luc Lagardère foundation 
In 2008, her novel Corps volatils was distinguished the Prix Goncourt du Premier Roman
In 2012, La Blonde et le Bunker received the Mention Spéciale du jury of the Prix Wepler
In 2013 and 2014, Jakuta Alikavazovic was a resident at the Villa Médicis at Rome
In 2017, her novel L'avancée de la nuit was awarded the Prix du Zorba, the Prix Castel du Roman de la Nuit

References

External links 
 Jakuta Alikavazovic on La Cause littéraire
 Jakuta Alikavazovic on Babelio
 Jakuta Alikavazovic : Des obsessions, des rituels (Écrire aujourd’hui) on Diacritik (13 April 2016)
 "Le Londres-Louxor", de Jakuta Alikavazovic : beauté de l'incertitude on Le Monde (7 January 2010)
 Jakuta Alikavazovic: Leçon d'équilibrisme n°1 on Ina.fr (video) (3 November 2004)

21st-century French novelists
French women short story writers
21st-century French short story writers
English–French translators
French children's writers
21st-century French women writers
French women children's writers
Prix Goncourt du Premier Roman recipients
1979 births
Writers from Paris
Living people
21st-century translators
Prix Médicis essai winners